Zeeshan Baba Siddique (born 3 October 1992) is an Indian politician from the Indian National Congress. He is currently a Member of the Legislative Assembly in Maharashtra Legislative Assembly. & President of Mumbai Youth Congress.

Personal life and education
Siddique was born in Bandra, Mumbai to the Indian National Congress leader and former member of the Maharashtra Legislative Assembly Baba Siddique and Shehzeen Siddique. In July 2015, he completed his Master's degree in Global Management & Public Leadership at the Regent's University London, United Kingdom.

Offices and Positions Held 

 Member of legislative Assembly (MLA) - (2019)
 President of Mumbai Indian Youth Congress. (2021)

Politics 
Siddique contested and won as a first term member of the Maharashtra Legislative Assembly representing the Vandre East seat in Mumbai, Maharashtra in 2019 Maharashtra Legislative Assembly election. He garnered 38,337 votes defeating Shiv Sena's Vishwanath Mahadeshwar the then mayor of Mumbai by 5790 votes. In May 2021, Bombay High Court ordered a probe against Zeeshan and Sonu Sood for supplying Remdesivir to needy during the pandemic.

See also 

 Srinivas BV

References

Maharashtra Assembly Election 2019: Key takeaways as debutants win big
Is Your 5-Year-Old Self Proud Of You? Asks Congress MLA Zeeshan Siddique

Members of the Maharashtra Legislative Assembly
Living people
1992 births
Indian politicians